Francis Hugh Mugliston  (7 June 1886 – 3 October 1932) was an English cricketer. A right-handed batsman and right-arm slow-medium bowler, he played first-class cricket for various teams between 1905 and 1911, mainly for Cambridge University. He was an all-round sportsman at Cambridge University where he won Blues for cricket, Association football and golf.

Career
Born 7 June 1886 in Singapore, Mugliston was educated at Rossall School and at Pembroke College, Cambridge. He was captain of the Cambridge football team and also played soccer for Corinthian F.C., the amateur club, including a tour of South Africa with the team in 1907.

Mugliston's first recorded cricket match was for the Straits Settlements against the Federated Malay States in February 1905. The same year, he made his first-class debut, playing for Cambridge University against Warwickshire and Gloucestershire, also playing three matches for the Lancashire Second XI that year.

He played twice more for Cambridge University in 1906, also playing two County Championship matches for Lancashire against Somerset and Sussex that year. He played several first-class matches for the university side in 1907 and 1908, gaining his blue in both years. He also represented the university at golf and football.

He played his final five matches for Lancashire in 1908, following which he played first-class cricket sporadically between 1909 and 1911, including one match for the Marylebone Cricket Club (MCC).

After cricket
After leaving Cambridge, he studied law and was called as a barrister to the Inner Temple in 1911; instead of practising law, however, he joined the Sudan civil service, though he was soon invalided home after catching dysentery. He joined the Duke of Cornwall's Light Infantry in September 1914 and was severely wounded at Ypres the following year. Discharged from the army, he joined the Aliens branch of the Home Office and was deputy chief inspector of the Aliens department at the time of his death. He died 3 October 1932 in Mayfair, London.
Francis Mugliston was indeed severely injured at Hooge (Ypres) on 27/28 June 1915. He was rescued by Private Jones (6 / DCLI), my Great Uncle. Under heavy rifle and shell fire Private Jones rescued two men who had been completely buried. He then proceeded to dress a severely wounded officer (Lieutenant Mugliston), carrying him (still under heavy fire) to a dressing station two miles away. For these acts of ‘conspicuous gallantry’ Private Jones was awarded the DCM - the first in Kitchener's New Army. A picture confirming this was published in the Daily Mirror. He was Gazetted on 6 September 1915.
As an act of gratitude Lieutenant Mugliston presented my Great Uncle with a silver cigarette case inscribed with my Great Uncle's initials and ‘ From F.H.Mugliston , Hooge 1915 ‘ . Private Jones was transferred into the Machine Gun Corps and subsequently listed as ‘ Missing presumed K.I.A ‘.

His body was never found and he is recorded on the Thiepval Monument, Pier and Face 5C and 12C.

References

1886 births
1932 deaths
People educated at Rossall School
Alumni of Pembroke College, Cambridge
English cricketers
Straits Settlements cricketers
Lancashire cricketers
Cambridge University cricketers
Marylebone Cricket Club cricketers
H. D. G. Leveson Gower's XI cricketers
People from British Malaya